This is a list of years in Portugal.

12th century
1139
1185

15th century
1415
1489

16th century
1508
1510
1515

17th century

18th century

19th century

20th century

21st century

See also
 Timeline of Portuguese history

 
Portugal history-related lists
Portugal